The 2020–21 Zimbabwe Domestic Twenty20 Competition was a Twenty20 cricket tournament that was played in Zimbabwe during April 2021. Five teams took part in the competition, with two matches being played each day. Due to a logistical challenge, the opening day match between Tuskers and Rhinos was moved back to 15 April, with the play-off and final being moved back one day as a result. The Matabeleland Tuskers won the last domestic T20 tournament to be played in Zimbabwe, during the 2018–19 season.

Following the conclusion of the group stage, Tuskers and Eagles qualified for the final of the tournament. Rocks beat Mountaineers to win the 3rd place play-off match, and in the final, Tuskers beat Eagles by 69 runs to win the tournament.

Points table

 Advanced to the Final
 Advanced to the 3rd Place Play-Off

Fixtures

Round-robin

Finals

References

External links
 Series home at ESPN Cricinfo

2021 in Zimbabwean cricket
Zimbabwe Domestic Twenty20 Competition